This is a list of compositions by Francisco Tárrega.

Main works

 Capricho árabe (Arabian Caprice)
 Alborada  
 Gran jota Aragonesa (Grand jota) 
 El columpio (The Swing)
 María (Gavotte)
 ¡Marieta! (Mazurka)
 ¡Adelita! (Mazurka)
 Rosita (Polka)
 Gran vals (Grand Waltz, used in the Nokia tune)
 Danza odalisca (Odalisque Dance)
 Pavana (Pavane)
 Paquito (Waltz)
 Pepita (Pepita)
 Danza mora (Moor Dance)
 Vals en re (Waltz in D major)
 Recuerdos de la Alhambra (Memories of the Alhambra)  
 Mazurka en sol (Mazurka in G)
 Sueño mazurka (Dream Mazurka, on a mazurka by Chopin)
 Minueto (Minuet)
 Isabel (Waltz on a theme by Johann Strauss II)
 La cartagenera (The Cartagena)
 Fantasía sobre motivos de "La Traviata" de Verdi (Fantasy on Motives of "La Traviata" by Verdi) 
 Fantasía sobre motivos de "Marina" de Arrieta (Fantasy on Motives of "Marina" by Arrieta)
 Serenata española (Spanish Serenade)  
 El ratón (The Mouse)
 Manchegas (Spanish Dance)
 ¡Maria! Tango (Maria! Tango, possibly not composed by Tárrega)
 La mariposa (The Butterfly)
 Malagueña fácil (Easy Malagueña)
 Estudio inspirado de Cramer (Study inspired by Cramer)
 Las dos hermanitas (The Two Little Sisters) 
 Variaciones sobre El Carnaval de Venecia de Paganini (Variations on Paganini's The Carnival of Venice)
 Preludio en re (Prelude in D)
 Preludio en mi (Prelude in E)
 Preludio en la (Prelude in A)
 Preludio en sol (Prelude in G)
 Preludio en mi (Prelude in E)
 Preludio en re (Prelude in D)
 Preludio en sol (Prelude in G)
 Preludio en la (Prelude in A)
 Lágrima (Teardrop)
 Preludio en re (Prelude in D)
 Preludio en la (Prelude in A)
 Preludio en la (Prelude in A)
 Preludio en si (Prelude in B)
 Preludio en mi (Prelude in E)
 Preludio en fa sostenido (Prelude in F-sharp)
 Preludio en re (Prelude in D)
 Endecha (Lament)
 Oremus (Let us Pray)
 Preludio en la (Prelude in A)
 Preludio en do (Prelude in C)
 Preludio en mi (Prelude in E)
 Preludio en la (Prelude in A)
 Preludio en la (Prelude in A)
 Preludio en la (Prelude in A)
 Preludio en la menor sobre un fragmento de Schumann (Prelude in A minor after a Fragment by Schumann)
 Preludio sobre un tema de Mendelssohn (Prelude on a Theme by Mendelsohn)
 Preludio pentatonica (Pentatonic Prelude)
 Estudio en forma de minueto (Study in the Form of a Minuet)
 Estudio sobre un tema de Damas (Study on a Theme by Damas)
 Estudio sobre un tema de Alard (Study on a Theme by Alard)
 Estudio sobre un fragmento de Beethoven (Study on a Fragment by Beethoven)
 Estudio sobre un fragmento de Mendelssohn (Study on a Fragment by Mendelssohn)
 Sueño trémolo (Dream (Tremolo))
 Estudio en sol (Study in G)
 Estudio en la (Study in A)
 Estudio en do (Study in C)
 Estudio en mi (Study in E)
 Estudio en la (Study in A)
 Estudio sobre un fuga de Bach (Study on a Fugue by Bach)
 Estudio sobre un tema de Verdi (Study over a Theme by Verdi)
 Estudio brillante de Alard (Brillant Study by Alard)
 Estudio sobre un tema de Wagner (Study on a Theme by Wagner)
 Estudio de arpegios (Arreggio Study)
 Estudio sobre una sonatina de Prudend (Study on a Sonatina by Prudend)
 Estudio de velocidad (Velocity Study)
 Mazurka sobre un tema anónimo español para dos guitarras (Mazurka on an Anonymous Spanish Theme for Two Guitars)
Notes

Other works
It's said that Tárrega made over 120 transcriptions of many famous composers. Tárrega also made some arrangements of famous Spanish music to the guitar. Composers include, Chopin, Schumann, Schubert, Beethoven, Mozart, Bach and more.

Tarrega